Nathan Eglington OAM (born 2 December 1980 in Murwillumbah, New South Wales) is a field hockey midfielder and striker from Australia, who was a member of the team that won the golden medal at the 2004 Summer Olympics in Athens.

He is nicknamed Eggy, and played domestic hockey for the Queensland Blades in his native country Australia, with whom he won the national title in 2003, 2004, 2006 and 2007. Eglington made his international debut in 2002, in a test series game against South Korea in Adelaide, scoring twice.

Eglington played 140 times for Australia scoring 50 goals before major injury prior to the 2008 Beijing Olympics, forced retirement from international competition at the age of 27 years.

He is married to fellow former Australian representative, Lisa Eglington. The pair live in Tweed Heads with their two children.

References

External links
 
 Profile on Hockey Australia

1980 births
Australian male field hockey players
Male field hockey forwards
Male field hockey midfielders
Commonwealth Games gold medallists for Australia
Field hockey players at the 2004 Summer Olympics
Field hockey players at the 2006 Commonwealth Games
2006 Men's Hockey World Cup players
Living people
Olympic field hockey players of Australia
Olympic gold medalists for Australia
Olympic medalists in field hockey
People from the Northern Rivers
Recipients of the Medal of the Order of Australia
Medalists at the 2004 Summer Olympics
Commonwealth Games medallists in field hockey
Sportsmen from New South Wales
Medallists at the 2006 Commonwealth Games